Brigadier-General Charles Robert Cureton  (21 October 1789 – 23 November 1848) was a British Army officer who served as Adjutant-General in India.

Cureton was born at Union Street in Southwark, London, the son of Edward Cureton and Henrietta Bill.

Military career
Cureton was commissioned as an ensign in the Shropshire militia on 21 April 1806. 
He fought at the Battle of Talavera in July 1809, the Battle of Bussaco in September 1810 and the Battle of Fuentes de Oñoro in May 1811 during the Peninsular War. He also saw action at the Siege of Badajoz in April 1812, the Battle of Salamanca in July 1812 and the Battle of Vitoria in June 1813 as well as the Battle of Orthez in February 1814, the Battle of Tarbes in March 1814 and the Battle of Toulouse in April 1814.

Cureton also fought at the Battle of Ghazni in July 1839 during the First Anglo-Afghan War and took part in the Gwalior campaign in December 1843. He commanded the cavalry at the Battle of Aliwal in January 1846 and the Battle of Sobraon in February 1846 during the First Anglo-Sikh War.

He became Adjutant-General in India from April 1846 and commanded the cavalry division at the Battle of Ramnagar where he was killed in November 1848 during the Second Anglo-Sikh War.

Private life
Two of his sons were General Sir Charles Cureton and Lieutenant General Edward Burgoyne Cureton.

References

Sources

British Militia officers
1789 births
1848 deaths
Companions of the Order of the Bath
14th King's Hussars soldiers
40th Regiment of Foot officers
20th Light Dragoons officers
16th The Queen's Lancers officers
British Army personnel of the Peninsular War
British military personnel of the First Anglo-Afghan War
British military personnel killed in the Second Anglo-Sikh War
British Army brigadiers